Nail is the fourth studio album by Scraping Foetus Off the Wheel. It was released in October 1985, through record labels Self Immolation and Some Bizzare.

Background 
The album incorporates a variety of musical genres, including classical and industrial rock, and the lyrics are often esoteric. For example, the tempo and instrumentation in "Descent into the Inferno" is infrequent: the song's first half is sparse and percussive; in the latter stages the song gathers momentum and features synthesizers. "The Overture from Pigdom Come", a composition resembling a classical piece of music, is juxtaposed with perhaps the most brutal track on the album, "Private War", a track that features one minute of various grinding noises.

There are various obscure references within the songs, some more lucid than others. "The Throne of Agony" has the lyrics "Alas, poor Yorick, I knew me well", a paraphrase of a line from Shakespeare's Hamlet (Hamlet: "Alas, poor Yorick! I knew him, Horatio..."). The line "Turn on, tune in, drop out" in "DI-1-9026" refers to the Timothy Leary phrase. Jack and the Beanstalk is also referenced, with a variation of the chant "Fee, fie, foe, fum!" appearing in the final track.

Critical reception 

AllMusic called it "possibly the best Foetus album [...] the sheer range of this music is hard to believe."

Track listing 

Note: Some CD pressings place "The Throne of Agony" and "!" together on one track.

Re-issue 
In 2007, the album was re-released by Some Bizzare records in a digipack format with remastered audio and re-worked artwork.

Accolades

Personnel 
Warne Livesey – production, engineering
J. G. Thirlwell (as Scraping Foetus Off The Wheel) – instruments, production, illustrations
Tim Young – mastering

Charts

References

External links 
 
 Nail at the official Foetus website

1985 albums
Foetus (band) albums
Albums produced by JG Thirlwell
Some Bizzare Records albums